Nikola Brejchová, née Tomečková (born 25 June 1974 in Zlín) is a javelin thrower from the Czech Republic. Her personal best throw is 65.91 metres, achieved in August 2004 in Linz.

Achievements

References

External links

sports-reference

1974 births
Living people
Czech female javelin throwers
Athletes (track and field) at the 1996 Summer Olympics
Athletes (track and field) at the 2000 Summer Olympics
Athletes (track and field) at the 2004 Summer Olympics
Olympic athletes of the Czech Republic
Universiade medalists in athletics (track and field)
Goodwill Games medalists in athletics
Sportspeople from Zlín
Universiade silver medalists for the Czech Republic
Competitors at the 2001 Goodwill Games